Jari Oosterwijk (born 3 March 1995) is a Dutch former professional footballer who plays as a forward.

Club career
Oosterwijk came to FC Twente as a youth player. He attended the club's academy and made his debut in professional football with Jong FC Twente in the Eerste Divisie in 2013. A year later, Oosterwijk played his first game in the main squad of the club, during the game with Vitesse he came on as a substitute. In the 2016–17 season, Oosterwijk played on a loan basis for NAC Breda. Oosterwijk played 57 league matches for FC Twente in which he scored thirteen times.

On 16 September 2019, his contract with Twente was terminated by mutual consent.

References

External links
 

1995 births
Living people
Footballers from Deventer
Association football forwards
Dutch footballers
FC Twente players
NAC Breda players
HHC Hardenberg players
Eredivisie players
Eerste Divisie players
Tweede Divisie players
Jong FC Twente players